Dennis O. Harper is founder and CEO of Generation YES, and active in the field of technology education. He was instrumental in the development of the Liberian Renaissance Education Complex.

Past positions
Harper has held a variety of posts throughout the education technology field. He was on the board of directors for the International Society for Technology in Education from June 1997 to June 1999. Harper was hired as the technology coordinator for the Olympia School District in Olympia, Washington from August 1992 to September 1996. From January 1988 to June 1992 Harper was an associate professor of Education and Academic Computing at the University of the Virgin Islands in St. Thomas. He was a Visiting Professor of Educational Technology at the University of Helsinki in Helsinki, Finland in 1987. In 1986 and 1987 he was the Educational Computing Coordinator at Institute of Education in Singapore, and before that was the supervisor of Teacher Education and director of the Special Education Computer Center at the University of California, Santa Barbara. He held that position from 1979 to 1986. Harper was also a lecturer at Universiti Kebangsaan Malaysia in 1983.

Before that Harper taught secondary school mathematics, science, and computer science in the U.S., Australia, West Germany, Liberia, and Spain. He has served on advisory boards with a variety of organizations and journals, including Technology and Learning Journal and Computers in the Schools Journal. He was also the International Editor of the Logo Exchange.

Publications
Harper wrote what is said to be the first college text on computer education, RUN: Computer Education, while a faculty member at the University of California. He is also the author of several journal articles and textbooks.

Awards and accolades
Harper has received the Golden Apple Award from the Corporation for Public Broadcasting (1997). He has been named "Shaper of Our Future" by Converge magazine (2000), "Technology Advocate for the United States" by District Administrator (2001), "Distinguished Educator of the Year" by Technology & Learning (1992), and one of the "Daring Dozen" by Edutopia magazine (2008).

Harper has keynoted at dozens of national and international conferences, including the Society for Information and Technology Education conference (2002), National Educational Computing Conference (2001), and the World Conference of Computers in Education (2001).

His creation of GenYES has also led to wide acclaim throughout the education industry, as one recent journal exemplified by proclaiming, "Dennis Harper literally wrote the blueprint on how to work with students to create technology plans."

References

External links
 Dennis Harper on Teacher Preparation from Edutopia
 Dennis Harper: Harnessing Student-Led Tech Support from Edutopia
 GenYES website
 Liberian Renaissance Education Complex

Year of birth missing (living people)
Living people
Youth empowerment people
American nonprofit executives
University of California, Santa Barbara faculty